Alexey Anatolyevich Gavrilov (Russian: Алексей Анатольевич Гаврилов; born August 6, 1983) is a Russian actor, producer, became very popular in 2008 in the series Univer. General Director of the magazine "Russian Pioneer" (since 2017).

Life and career
Alexey Gavrilov was born in Magnitogorsk, Russian SFSR, Soviet Union. In a military family. In 1994 he moved to Moscow.

In 2007 he graduated from the All-Russian State University of Cinematography named after S. A. Gerasimov (Alexey Batalov's workshop).

2007 the second director of the film "Closed spaces"
2007 linear producer of the reality show "Call" SOXO pro for the channel STS.
Since 2017 the general director of the magazine "Russian pioneer".

Filmography 
 My Love 
 Travelling with Pets 
 Univer
 SashaTanya

References 

 
 YouTube

External links
 

Living people
1983 births
People from Magnitogorsk
Russian male film actors
Russian male television actors
Russian film producers
Place of birth missing (living people)